Jackie Marsh may refer to:

 Jackie Marsh (Coronation Street), a character on the British soap opera Coronation Street
 Jackie Marsh (footballer) (born 1948), English former footballer